Azare Airstrip  is an airstrip  south of Azare in Bauchi State, Nigeria.

See also
Transport in Nigeria
List of airports in Nigeria

References

 Google Earth

External links
OpenStreetMap - Azare
HERE Maps - Azare airport

Airports in Nigeria